Ottaba is a rural locality in the Somerset Region, Queensland, Australia.

Geography 

The Brisbane Valley Highway enters the locality from the south (Biarra) and exits to the north (Toogoolawah).

Ottaba railway station is an abandoned railway station on the dismantled Brisbane Valley railway line.

History 
On 26 February 1904, the Queensland Railways Department named the former railway station in the area Ottaba, which is a Wakawaka language word in the Dungibara dialect meaning come on. Anthropologist Walter Edmund Roth is believed to have suggested the name. The locality takes its name from the former railway station.

Newton Provisional School opened on 15 September 1898. In 1905, it was renamed Ottaba Provisional School. On 1 January 1909, it became Ottaba State School. It closed temporarily in 1924. It permanently closed circa 1936.

Education 
There are no schools in Ottaba. The nearest government primary and secondary schools are Toogoolawah State School and Toogoolawah State High School, both in neighbouring Toogoolawah to the north.

References

Further reading 

 
  — also includes Mount Beppo State School, Ivorys Creek Provisional School, Cross Roads Provisional School, Ottaba Provisional School, Murrumba State School, Mount Esk Pocket School, Kipper Provisional School, Lower Cressbrook School, Fulham School, Sandy Gully State School, Cooeeimbardi State School, Scrub Creek State School

Suburbs of Somerset Region
Localities in Queensland